The Tripartite Agreement between Ethiopia, Eritrea and Somalia is a cooperation agreement signed between the three countries' leaders on 5 September 2018.

September 2018 agreement
The Tripartite Agreement, formally titled the Joint Declaration on Comprehensive Cooperation Between Ethiopia, Somalia and Eritrea, states that given their "close ties of geography, history, culture and religion as well as vital common interests" and "respecting each other's independence, sovereignty, and territorial integrity", the three countries agree to cooperate and "build close political, economic, social, cultural and security ties", coordinate to "promote regional peace and security" and establish a Joint High-Level Committee to coordinate the implementation. The agreement was signed in Asmara on 5 September 2018 by Abiy Ahmed, prime minister of Ethiopia, Mohamed Abdullahi Mohamed (Farmaajo), president of Somalia, and Isaias Afwerki, president of Eritrea.

Meetings and actions
The second tripartite meeting was planned for November 2018, with the three national leaders meeting in Gondar and Bahir Dar in Amhara Region.

On 27 January 2020, Abiy, Isaias and Farmaajo held a Tripartite meeting in Asmara. They adopted a Joint Plan of Action for 2020 focussing on "peace, stability, security, and economic and social development" and including a "security" component to "combat and neutralise ... terrorism, arms and human trafficking and drugs smuggling". Martin Plaut, a journalist specialising in Africa, commented on the lack of a press conference following the meeting, complaining about the lack of details regarding the Tripartite plans. Plaut suggested that the 27 January Tripartite meeting, together with bilateral meetings by Abiy to an Eritrean military base in July 2020, Farmaajo to Asmara on 4 October 2020, and Isaias to the Harar Meda Airport air base in Bishoftu on 14–15 October 2020 were used by the three leaders to discuss and prepare strategy for the Tigray War.

References

History of Eritrea
History of Ethiopia
History of Somalia
Horn of Africa